Wigan Wallgate railway station is one of two railway stations serving the town centre of Wigan in Greater Manchester, England. The station serves two routes, the Manchester-Southport Line and the Manchester-Kirkby Line. It is 16 miles north-west of Manchester Victoria (distance via Atherton).  The station is managed by Northern Trains, who operate all trains serving it.

Description
There are three platforms, two through platforms and one bay platform for trains departing towards Southport or Kirkby. Platforms are below street level and reached via a flight of stairs from the street level concourse which contains a ticket office and a newsagent. However, a goods lift has been modified for passenger use to ensure step-free access to the platform.

The ticket office is staffed from 06:00 to 21:00 Monday to Saturday and from 08:00 to 20:00 on Sundays. Automated ticket barriers are in operation. Train running information is provided via digital display screens, timetable posters and automated announcements.  Toilets and a waiting room are available at platform level.

History

 1848   The Lancashire & Yorkshire Railway (L&YR) opened the line between Liverpool and Lostock Junction (west of Bolton on the Manchester to Preston line) on 20 November 1848.  The original L&YR station at Wigan was located east of the current station, closer to the London & North Western Railway (L&NWR) station. The early train services on the line ran to Liverpool, Bolton, Bury and Manchester.
 1855   The railway opened between Wigan and Southport on 9 April 1855.  Wigan's L&YR station was then relocated to a position west of where Wallgate station is today.
 1868   The L&YR introduced a passenger service on 14 September 1868 between Wigan L&YR station and Chorley, using a newly opened route from Hindley to Blackrod, near Horwich. On 1 November 1869, the Chorley trains were extended to Blackburn. The London & North Western Railway (L&NWR) ran a competing service from Wigan L&NWR via Boar's Head, which shared the same route from Adlington onwards to Blackburn.
 1888   On 1 October 1888, the L&YR opened a new line from Pendleton in Salford via Atherton to Hindley. This provided a faster, more direct route for trains from Manchester and avoided the busy bottleneck around Bolton station.  The L&YR then introduced fast, regular trains between Manchester Victoria and Liverpool Exchange, in direct competition with the L&NWR which used the more direct route between Manchester Exchange and Liverpool Lime Street.
 1889   A bypass line opened on 1 June 1889 between Hindley and Pemberton, passing to the south of Wigan.  This allowed a faster journey for the L&YR's Manchester – Liverpool expresses by avoiding Wigan station.  Express trains from Liverpool continued to serve Wigan on the route to Bury, Rochdale and West Yorkshire. The by-pass line was also used by freight trains to and from Liverpool Docks, which benefited by avoiding the Wigan L&YR station area.
 1896   The L&YR opened its Wigan station on its current site on 2 February 1896.  The railway company had received extensive criticism regarding the standard of its station and facilities since it opened the line through the town in 1848.  In 1896 Wigan finally received a railway station in line with the town's size and importance.
 1924   Renamed from "Wigan" to "Wigan Wallgate" on 2 June 1924.
 1960   Passenger trains between Wigan Wallgate, Chorley and Blackburn via Hindley were withdrawn on 4 January 1960.
 1968   The last steam trains ran on British Railways and by this time most services through Wigan Wallgate had been converted to diesel multiple unit (DMU) operation. The steam loco depot just west of Wallgate was closed and the sidings converted for stabling of DMUs. The 1965 British Rail (London Midland) timetable still shows express trains (Liverpool Exchange to Yorkshire and beyond) using or bypassing Wigan Wallgate.
 1969   The direct line from Hindley to Pemberton was closed on 14 July 1969 and all Manchester to Liverpool Exchange trains were routed through Wallgate.
 1970    The line from Bolton to Rochdale via Bury was closed on 5 October 1970. Trains from Liverpool now generally terminated at Bolton.  Southport trains provided the main service to and from Manchester Victoria.
 1977   On 30 April 1977, the former L&YR terminus at Liverpool Exchange was closed.  Trains were re-routed onto a new underground line beneath Liverpool city centre to Moorfields and Liverpool Central.  Since diesel multiple units could not operate in the tunnels, trains from the Wigan line initially terminated at Sandhills (the last surface station), with passengers transferring to or from electric trains on the Southport or Ormskirk lines for the short trip into Liverpool city centre.
 1977   During the early and mid-1970s, the frequency of British Rail's trains from Wigan Wallgate was reduced. Services operated at irregular intervals, those from the Liverpool line ran only as far as Wigan or Bolton and there were no off-peak trains on the Atherton line. In May 1977, the train service was significantly improved under the financial sponsorship of Greater Manchester PTE. GMPTE subsidised British Rail to operate a regular interval timetable throughout the day, including stopping trains via the Atherton line. The improved frequency resulted in an increase in off-peak passenger numbers.
 1978   The trains to Liverpool (which had terminated at Sandhills following the opening of the Merseyrail link to Liverpool Central) were cut back to Kirkby.  This happened when Merseyrail completed electrification of the western section of line between Liverpool and Kirkby.  The diesel train from Wigan was scheduled to meet an electric train from Liverpool at Kirkby and passengers transfer trains to complete their journeys.  This arrangement continues at Kirkby today.
 1978   The Victorian-era buildings on the station platform at Wallgate were demolished and new structures erected. The street-level building remained largely unscathed.
 1988   Prior to 1988, passengers travelling to Manchester were limited to arriving or departing at one station – the ex-L&YR terminus at Manchester Victoria. In May 1988 a new rail link was opened in Salford, which allowed trains from Wigan and Bolton to use the lines into either Salford Central and Victoria, or Deansgate, Oxford Road and Piccadilly stations.In addition to an improved choice of central Manchester termini, most local trains from Wigan were extended to suburban destinations on the far side of Greater Manchester, or beyond.In particular, the trains to or from Southport tend to be directed onto longer suburban routes south of Manchester. The exact destination varies with each timetable revision, but in recent years, Southport trains have run through to Buxton or Chester, via Stockport.
 2003–2004   A major refurbishment of infrastructure was completed in October 2004. The £12 million project involved a complete renewal of the track and signalling at Wallgate station and the adjacent carriage sidings.  The LMS-era colour light signalling was replaced with a modern electronic control system.

During Summer 2012, the ticket office was rebuilt and refurbished.

Services

Passenger 

DMUs are unable to use this station because the body-side steps under the doors foul the platform coping stones here. During Monday to Saturday daytimes, this is the regular service pattern, however due to the Preston to Manchester electrification works during the 2015 summer timetable, there was an amended timetable throughout this period. There were no train services between Bolton and any Manchester station on Saturdays and Sundays between 2 May to 13 December, trains were routed via Walkden.

Monday to Saturday:
1 train per hour (tph)  via 
1 train per hour (tph)  via  and 
1 train per hour (tph)  via  and 
1 train per hour (tph)  via  and 
2 trains per hour (tph) 
1 train per hour (tph) to 

Sunday:
1 train per hour (tph)  via  and 
1 train per hour (tph) 
There is no Kirkby service on Sundays.

From 14 December 2015, the weekday & Saturday timetable reverted to that used prior to the Farnworth Tunnel blockade. There are 3 tph via Bolton toward Manchester (2 to Victoria and 1 to Manchester Airport via Piccadilly) and 2tph via Walkden (both to Victoria). Two per hour run westwards to Southport and one to Kirkby, whilst two others terminate here. In the evenings there are hourly services to the Airport via Bolton, to Southport and to Victoria via Atherton.

Previously there was no Sunday service on the Atherton line, this changed in May 2010 when a 12-month trial of an hourly Sunday service began between Wallgate and Manchester Victoria via Atherton (after Greater Manchester PTA agreed a funding package with train operator Northern Rail in December 2009). Transport for Greater Manchester made the Sunday service a requirement of the Northern refranchising from April 2016.

The timetable underwent a further major change with the summer 2018 version introduced on 20 May. Trains via Bolton from here have been withdrawn (save for a very limited morning weekday peak service to Manchester Piccadilly and ) - these now run to/from neighbouring  (though connections are available at Hindley). There are now 3tph to Manchester Victoria, all of which run via Atherton. The westbound service continues to Southport and Kirkby as before. On Sundays, there are two trains to Manchester per hour and one to Southport.

The loss of Bolton service proved unpopular with many regular users of the line and so Northern (Arriva Rail North) agreed to modify the timetable so that the current service to Wigan N.W. from both Manchester stations will be diverted to run to Wallgate and onward to Southport from the December 2019 timetable update.  Services from Leeds and Blackburn via Atherton will henceforth terminate/start here (except on Sundays, when the service runs via Atherton to Blackburn).

Changes instituted as a result of the COVID-19 pandemic since the spring of 2020 have seen the timetable altered once again, with the Calder Valley service from Leeds via Dewsbury and Walkden routed back to nearby North Western through the day.  Just a small number of peak period services on this route serve Wallgate in the weekday peaks.  There is still an hourly service to/from Blackburn via Todmorden (continuing through to Kirkby in the daytime) from here during the day and in the evening.

The Wigan North Western to Leeds services have been moved back to Wigan Wallgate in the December 2022 timetable.

Freight
There was a limited freight service through Wigan Wallgate during the early 2000s, operated by EWS running to Knowsley Freight Terminal on the Kirkby line - these were suspended from 2006 onwards. Most freight services through Wigan run through nearby Wigan North Western on the West Coast Main Line. As of June 2016, freight service to Knowsley Freight Terminal has been reinstated which uses Wallgate instead of Wigan North Western, where most freight operates. The new service runs to/from Teesside 6 days per week.

References

External links

Railway stations in the Metropolitan Borough of Wigan
DfT Category D stations
Former Lancashire and Yorkshire Railway stations
Railway stations in Great Britain opened in 1848
Northern franchise railway stations
Buildings and structures in Wigan